The Wings of the Dove is a 1902 novel by Henry James.

The Wings of the Dove may also refer to:
 The Wings of the Dove (1981 film), a French film
 The Wings of the Dove (1997 film), a British-American film
 "The Wings of the Dove", an 1827 poem by Felicia Hemans

See also
Wings of a Dove (disambiguation)